The 2000 NCAA Division I Men's Tennis Championships were the 54th annual championships to determine the national champions of NCAA Division I men's singles, doubles, and team collegiate tennis in the United States.

Stanford defeated Virginia Commonwealth in the championship final, 4–0, to claim the Cardinal's seventeenth team national title.

Host sites
This year's tournaments were played at the Dan Magill Tennis Complex at the University of Georgia in Athens, Georgia. 

The men's and women's tournaments would not be held at the same site until 2006.

See also
NCAA Division II Tennis Championships (Men, Women)
NCAA Division III Tennis Championships (Men, Women)

References

External links
List of NCAA Men's Tennis Champions

NCAA Division I tennis championships
NCAA Division I Men's Tennis Championships
NCAA Division I Men's Tennis Championships
NCAA Division I Men's Tennis Championships